Say Chhum  (born 5 February 1945) is a Cambodian politician who has been the president of the Senate of Cambodia since 2015. He was the first vice president of the Senate until June 2015, when he succeeded Chea Sim upon the latter's death. He served as the Chairman of the Permanent Committee of the Central Committee of the Cambodian People's Party. 

He was elected to represent Kampong Speu Province in the National Assembly in 2003. He also served as Second Vice-President of the National Assembly.

As First Vice-President of the Senate, Say Chhum served as acting Senate President when the ailing Chea Sim was absent. Shortly after Chea Sim's death, Say Chhum was unanimously elected as President of the Senate on 9 June 2015 by the 51 senators present.

His son, Say Sam Al, was appointed Minister of the Environment in 2013.

References

1945 births
People from Kampong Cham province 
Members of the National Assembly (Cambodia)
Members of the Senate (Cambodia) 
Cambodian People's Party politicians
Living people
Presidents of the Senate (Cambodia)